Henry of Burgundy (c. 1035 – January 27, 1070/1074), called the Gallant (le Damoiseau), was the eldest surviving son and heir of Robert I, Duke of Burgundy, second son of Robert II of France, and his wife, Helie of Semur, granddaughter of Henry I, Duke of Burgundy. Little is known about his life. He died shortly before his father and was never duke himself.

The name of Henry's wife is not known: both Sibylla and Clémence have been suggested. The first of these derives from an undated obituary from Besançon, Sainte-Etienne, naming "Sibilla, mater ducus Burgundie" (Sibylla, mother of the duke of Burgundy), it being reasoned that since she is mother of a duke but not herself called 'duchess', she must have been married to the sole father of a duke who was not a duke himself, Henry. However, historian Jean Richard has pointed out that this likely simply related the deceased to the duke at the time it was recorded, and that this referred to Sibylla of Burgundy, Duchess of Burgundy, mother of then-ruling Hugh II, Duke of Burgundy. The observation of repeated use of the name Clémence among the descendants of Henry's son Odo I, Duke of Burgundy led Richard suggested that as the possible name of Odo's mother, though Odo's wife had a sister, Clementia of Burgundy, who could just as well have been the inspiration for its use among their descendants. Her origin is likewise undocumented and subject to speculation. Based on the use of the byname Borel by Odo, genealogist Szabolcs de Vajay proposed that his mother was a daughter of Berenguer Ramon I, Count of Barcelona and his third wife, Guisle of Lluca, and hence granddaughter of Ramon Borrell, Count of Barcelona, although there is no documentary evidence that this was the case. Henry's wife died on or after July 6, 1074.

Family

Henry and his wife had the following children:
 Hugh I, Duke of Burgundy (1057–1093)
 Odo I, Duke of Burgundy (1058–1103)
 Robert, bishop of Langres (1059–1111)
 Helie, a nun (b. 1061)
 Beatrice (b. 1063), married Guy III, Lord of Vignory
 Reginald/Raynald, abbot of Saint-Pierre de Flavigny (1065–1090)
 Henry (1066–1112), count of Portugal from 1093 and father of King Afonso I of Portugal

References

House of Burgundy
House of Capet
1030s births
1070s deaths
Year of birth uncertain
Year of death uncertain